Marina Aleksandrovna Aitova, née Korzhova (born 13 September 1982) is a Kazakhstani high jumper. Her personal best jump is 1.99 metres, achieved in July 2009 in Athens.

Biography
Born in Karaganda, Kazakh SSR, Soviet Union, Aitova made her first appearances on the world stage in 2003, competing at the 2003 IAAF World Indoor Championships and the 2003 World Championships in Athletics, but she did not get beyond the qualifiers in either competition. Aitova represented her country at the 2004 Summer Olympics, but again she failed to progress beyond the qualifying round. She competed at the 2007 World Championships and finished seventh in the final. In 2008, she took fifth place in the IAAF World Indoor Championships in Athletics and attended the 2008 Beijing Olympics, finishing tenth overall. She made her second World Championships appearance at 2009 World Championships in Athletics, but did not make the final cut. She won the gold at the 2010 Asian Indoor Athletics Championships, equalling the championship record of 1.93 metres.

Achievements

References

1982 births
Living people
Kazakhstani female high jumpers
Athletes (track and field) at the 2004 Summer Olympics
Athletes (track and field) at the 2008 Summer Olympics
Olympic athletes of Kazakhstan
Asian Games medalists in athletics (track and field)
Kazakhstani people of Russian descent
Athletes (track and field) at the 2012 Summer Olympics
Athletes (track and field) at the 2002 Asian Games
Athletes (track and field) at the 2006 Asian Games
Athletes (track and field) at the 2014 Asian Games
Universiade medalists in athletics (track and field)
Asian Games gold medalists for Kazakhstan
Asian Games silver medalists for Kazakhstan
Medalists at the 2002 Asian Games
Medalists at the 2006 Asian Games
Universiade gold medalists for Kazakhstan
Medalists at the 2007 Summer Universiade
21st-century Kazakhstani women